The Roman Catholic Archdiocese of Douala is the Metropolitan See for the Ecclesiastical province of Douala in Cameroon. The current archbishop is Archbishop Samuel Kleda; he had previously been the coadjutor archbishop
to the Archbishop Emeritus, Cardinal Christian Wiyghan Tumi.

History
 March 31, 1931: Established as Apostolic Prefecture of Douala from the Apostolic Vicariate of Cameroun 
 May 27, 1932: Promoted as Apostolic Vicariate of Douala
 September 14, 1955: Promoted as Diocese of Douala
 March 18, 1982: Promoted as Metropolitan Archdiocese of Douala

Special churches
The seat of the archbishop is the Cathédrale Saint-Pierre et Saint-Paul in Douala.

Bishops

Ordinaries

Prefect Apostolic of Douala
 (Father) Mathurin-Marie Le Mailloux, C.S.Sp. (1931-1932); see below

Vicars Apostolic of Douala
 Mathurin-Marie Le Mailloux, C.S.Sp. (1932-1945); see above
 Pierre Bonneau, C.S.Sp. (1946-1957)

Bishops of Douala
 Thomas Mongo (1957-1973)
 Simon Tonyé (1973-1982): see below

Archbishops of Douala
 Simon Tonyé (1982-1991); see above
 Cardinal Christian Wiyghan Tumi (1991-2009)
 Samuel Kleda (2009–present)

Coadjutor bishops
Simon Tonyé (1969-1973)
Samuel Kleda (2007-2009)

Auxiliary bishops
Thomas Mongo (1955-1957), appointed Bishop here
Simon-Victor Tonyé Bakot (1987-1993), appointed Bishop of Edéa
Gabriel Simo (1987-1994), appointed Auxiliary Bishop of Bafoussam
Dieudonné Bogmis (1999-2004), appointed Bishop of Eséka

Other priests of this diocese who became bishops
Pierre-Célestin Nkou, appointed Bishop of Sangmélima in 1963
Marcellin-Marie Ndabnyemb, appointed Bishop of Batouri in 2018

Suffragan Dioceses
 Bafang
 Bafoussam
 Edéa
 Eséka
 Nkongsamba

See also
 Roman Catholicism in Cameroon
 List of Roman Catholic dioceses in Cameroon

Sources
 GCatholic.org

Douala
Douala
A